In human mitochondrial genetics, Haplogroup M30 is a human mitochondrial DNA (mtDNA) haplogroup.

Origin
Haplogroup M30 (coding region: 195A-514dCA-12007-15431) is a South-Asian  or an India-specific maternal lineage of the macrohaplogroup M identified by the mutations T195A, G15431A and G12007A.

Haplogroup M30 used to be a part of M4 haplogroup distinguished by G15431A. Haplogroup M30 shares a common coding region mutation (12007) together with the M4, M18, M37 and M38 haplogroups from the root of haplogroup M (superhaplogroup M4'30). M4′30 super-clade is the only clade that shares an intermediate lineage between 2 haplogroups, while the rest of all M lineages have originated independently from the root of macrohaplogroup M; thus supporting the idea of rapid dispersal of modern humans along the Asian coast after they left Africa, followed by a long period of isolation.

Haplogroup M30 was identified in 2005 based on complete mitochondrial genome sequences of 24 Indian samples. It was designated as a new lineage with sub-haplogroups M30a, M30b, M30c, M30d based on observed mutations sites. The mutations characterizing this lineage were observed in five samples from eastern part of India, that is Bihar (Kurmi, Yadav and Baniya), West Bengal (Mahishya), Orissa (Saora) and two samples from south India (Christians of Karnataka and Lambadi of Andhra Pradesh). Previously identified Haplogroup M18 was collapsed to reside in M30 as a sub-lineage.

In 2006, the definition of M30 was narrowed down by identifying it with the mutations T195A, 15431A and G12007A. The study detailed an individual from the Reddy population of Andhra Pradesh categorized into M30a; a sample of Thogataveera from Andhra Pradesh classified into M30b; the presence of M30c in Thogataveera of Andhra Pradesh and Chaturvedi of Uttar Pradesh, and finally, the identification of M30d in Bhargava of Uttar Pradesh and Thogataveera of Andhra Pradesh. In 2009, Subhaplogroup M30e was identified among Kathodi, Kathakur and Mathakur in Western region of India.

In 2006, Sahoo and Kashyap reported haplogroup M30 in Oriya Brahmins, Karanams, Khandayats, Gope (aka Gour or Yadavs); and in tribes of Juang and Saora of Orissa. The Saora exhibited a high frequency of M30 (of about 32% of the sample size) followed by Karanams (24%), Oriya Brahmins (20%) and Juang (20%). Khandayat and Gope showed a lower frequency (about 6%) of M30. M30 was also detected at low frequencies (1.5%–2.5%) in Pardhan, Naikpod Gond and Andh tribal populations of Andhra Pradesh.

The age of M30 lineage was estimated at 33,042 ± 7,840 Years Before Present. However, Thangarajah, et al. (2006) dated it to 15,400 ± 6300 YBP. Rajkumar, et al. put forward the estimated coalescence time of haplogroup M30 to be 15,400 ± 6300 ybp, and that of its sub-haplogroups M30a and M30c to be 5100 ± 3600 ybp. The ages of M30b and M30d were computed to be 4177 ± 2800 years and 12,800 ± 5700 ybp respectively. This period corresponds with the late-Mesolithic in India and the Levant.

Distribution
M30 has a broad geographic, ethnic and linguistic range in India. It has been detected in northern and southern India, in Australoids and Caucasoids, and in Dravidian and Indo-European speakers.  This supposedly lends credence to the long speculated possibility of Dravidian speakers migrating through Iran to India. This view is supported by the presence of Indian haplogroups in Iran, and the close relationship between the Dravidian and Elamite languages.

M30 haplogroup has been detected in Palestinians and is supposedly due to a recent gene flow from India into that region. M30 is found in Eastern Yemeni populations, Upper Egypt and Kesra (Tunisia), while M30 individuals were found to constitute 7.5% of the total population of Hadramawt (Yemen). Apart from Saudi Arabia, M30 has also been detected in the maternal lineages of China. Peng et al. (2017) have found one individual who belongs to mtDNA haplogroup M30c1 in a sample of 28 Tajiks from Dushanbe, Tajikistan, two individuals who belong to mtDNA haplogroup M30h (bearing mutations at the 16093, 4394, 4491, and 12451 loci) in a sample of 68 Kyrgyz from Taxkorgan, Xinjiang, China, one individual who belongs to mtDNA haplogroup M30* (bearing additional mutations at the 11437 and 16274 loci) in a sample of 66 Wakhis from Taxkorgan, and one individual who belongs to mtDNA haplogroup M30 (bearing additional mutations at the 16234 and 16153 loci, possibly marking a pre-M30e branch) in a sample of 86 Sarikolis from Taxkorgan.

To sum up, M30 haplogroup individuals have been found in
 Yemen
 Egypt
 Tunisia
 Palestine
 Saudi Arabia
 Iran
 Tajikistan
 India
 Nepal
 China

Subclades

Tree
This phylogenetic tree of haplogroup  subclades is based on the Van Oven 2008 tree and subsequent published research.

See also
Genealogical DNA test
Genetic Genealogy
Human mitochondrial genetics
Population Genetics
Human mitochondrial DNA haplogroups

References

External links
Ian Logan's Mitochondrial DNA Site

M30